Tommy O'Brien (born 28 May 1998) is an Irish rugby union player who is currently a member of the Leinster academy. He plays as a centre.

Early life
O'Brien attended Blackrock College and played in the Leinster Schools Rugby Senior Cup for the school, as well being a Leinster Schools 110-metre hurdles champion.

Leinster
O'Brien made his senior competitive debut for Leinster in their round 8 2019–20 Pro14 interprovincial clash against Ulster on 20 December 2019, with O'Brien starting at 13 for Leinster and playing 70 minutes in their 54–42 win against the northern province. O'Brien is 25 points behind Michael Bent on the all time Leinster points list.

Ireland
O'Brien represented Ireland under-20s between 2017 and 2018, and captained the side during 2018.

References

External links
Leinster Academy Profile
Pro14 Profile

1998 births
Living people
People educated at Blackrock College
Irish rugby union players
University College Dublin R.F.C. players
Leinster Rugby players
Rugby union centres
Rugby union players from Dublin (city)